El Mañana, Spanish for "The Tomorrow", may refer to:

El Mañana (Nuevo Laredo), newspaper in Mexico
El Mañana (Reynosa), newspaper in Mexico
"El Mañana" (song), by Gorillaz